First Lady of Mozambique (Portuguese: Primeira-Dama de Moçambique) is the title held by the wife of the president of Mozambique. There have been just four first ladies since Mozambique's independence in 1975. The country's current first lady is Isaura Nyusi, wife of President Filipe Nyusi, who has held the position since 2015.

Office of the First Lady
The Office of the First Lady was established by Article 17 of the Internal Regulations Decree. The first lady supports and developments cultural and social initiatives with the official assistance of the first lady's office. The office is headed by a presidential cabinet member.

History
Former Mozambican first lady Graça Machel is the only person to have served as the first lady of two different republics. She became the first lady of South Africa on 18 July 1998 upon her marriage to Nelson Mandela.

First ladies of Mozambique

See also
President of Mozambique

References

Living people

Politics of Mozambique
Presidents of Mozambique
Mozambique
Year of birth missing (living people)
Lists of Mozambican people
Mozambique politics-related lists